Gertrude Wirschinger, better known as Penny McLean (born 4 November 1948), is an Austrian vocalist who initially gained acclaim with the disco music act Silver Convention, but also had exposure as a single recording artist. As a solo singer, she is most remembered for her million seller "Lady Bump". She is also an author.

Early life
She was born Gertrude Wirschinger in Klagenfurt, Austria.

Music career
In the early 1970s she was part of the duo Barbra & Helmut. They released "Hideaway" bw "Stop" on the Telefunken label in 1972. Late she was a member of the trio Tony & Liza & Penny. In 1973, they released a single on the Ariola label, "Öffne Die Tür" ("Open The Door") bw "Der Fremde" ("The Stranger").
By the mid-70s, she was a member of Silver Convention, a group that also included Linda G. Thompson and Ramona Wulf. They had hits with "Save me" and "Fly, Robin, Fly".
Around mid 1977, McLean left Silver Convention. She was replaced by Zenda Jacks.
In October 1976, her single "Devil Eyes" was released on the Ariola label. Around July 1978, her album The Best of Penny McLean was released on Jupiter Records. By late 1980, she was on the Teldec label roster.

Hits
Her hit "Lady Bump" sold in the millions. She also had hits with "1-2-3-4-Fire", "Dance, Bunny, Honey, Honey, Dance" and more.

"Lady Bump"
By November 1975, the track bw "The Lady Bumps On" was rated # 14 in the New York discos. In January 1976, it was #8 on the Cash box pop singles charts. In July 1976, "Lady Bump" #7 in Australia's 2S Music Survey. The single itself sold 3 million copies.

Author
As a popular author, she has written on spiritual and numerology matters.
 Some of the books she has written are Lass los, was dich festhält. Von der Kunst, du selbst zu sein, Numerologie und Schicksal. Ihr Leben ist berechenbar and Schattenspringer - Ein Jacobsweg der Seele.

Discography

Studio albums

Compilation albums

Singles

Film and television

References

External links
 
 
 

Living people
Austrian pop singers
20th-century Austrian women singers
Musicians from Klagenfurt
Austrian women writers
1948 births
English-language singers from Austria
Silver Convention members